Bhavani is a 1967 Indian Tamil-language film directed by T. R. Ramanna and written by K. S. Gopalakrishnan. It was produced by D. K. Shankar of Anna Productions, who doubled as editor. The film stars Jaishankar and Vijayakumari. It was released on 5 August 1967.

Plot

Cast 
Male cast
 Jaishankar
 S. A. Ashokan
 Nagesh
 Sundarrajan

Female cast
 Vijayakumari
 L. Vijayalakshmi
 Vanisri
 M. V. Rajamma
 Manorama

Soundtrack 
The soundtrack was composed by M. S. Viswanathan, with lyrics by Kannadasan.

Release and reception 
Bhavani was released on 5 August 1967, and distributed by Eveyaar Films. Kalki gave the film a negative review, criticising its stage play-like feel.

References

External links 
 

1960s Tamil-language films
Films directed by T. R. Ramanna
Films scored by M. S. Viswanathan
Films with screenplays by K. S. Gopalakrishnan